Nærbø is a former municipality in Rogaland county, Norway.  The administrative centre of the municipality was the village of Nærbø where the Old Nærbø Church is located.  The  municipality was located in the district of Jæren inside the northern part of the present-day municipality of Hå. The municipality existed from 1894 until its dissolution in 1964.

History
The municipality of Nærbø was established in 1894 when the old municipality of Hå was split in half into Varhaug and Nærbø.  Initially, Nærbø had 1,806 residents. During the 1960s, there were many municipal mergers across Norway due to the work of the Schei Committee. On 1 January 1964, the three neighboring municipalities of Nærbø (population: 3,926), Varhaug (population: 3,454), and Ogna (population: 1,470) were merged to form the new Hå Municipality (resurrecting the name of the old municipality that was dissolved in 1894).

Government
All municipalities in Norway, including Nærbø, are responsible for primary education (through 10th grade), outpatient health services, senior citizen services, unemployment and other social services, zoning, economic development, and municipal roads.  The municipality is governed by a municipal council of elected representatives, which in turn elects a mayor.

Municipal council
The municipal council  of Nærbø was made up of 17 representatives that were elected to four year terms.  The party breakdown of the final municipal council was as follows:

See also
List of former municipalities of Norway

References

Hå
Former municipalities of Norway
1894 establishments in Norway
1964 disestablishments in Norway